Newtonhead railway station was a railway station near the town of Ayr, South Ayrshire, Scotland. The station was part of the Glasgow and South Western Railway.

History
It opened for passengers on 1 October 1864 and closed on 1 April 1868.

References

Butt, R.V.J. (1995). The Directory of Railway Stations, Patrick Stephens Ltd, Sparkford.

Disused railway stations in South Ayrshire
Railway stations in Great Britain opened in 1864
Railway stations in Great Britain closed in 1868
Former Glasgow and South Western Railway stations